Dominican ship Separación may refer to one of the following ships of the Dominican Navy:

 , the first armed Dominican naval vessel
 , the former American  USS Skirmish (AM-303); acquired by the Dominican Navy in January 1965; renamed Prestol Botello, 1976 and in active service
 , the former American  USS Passaconaway (AN-86); acquired by the Dominican Navy in September 1976 and is in active service

Dominican Navy ship names